"East/West" is the ninth episode of the fourth season of the American anthology black comedy–crime drama television series Fargo. It is the 39th overall episode of the series and was written by series creator Noah Hawley and Lee Edward Colston II, and directed by Michael Uppendahl. It originally aired on FX on November 15, 2020.

The season is set in Kansas City, Missouri from November 1950 to early 1951, and follows two crime syndicates as they vie for control of the underground. One of these is Loy Cannon, the head of a crime syndicate made up of black migrants fleeing the Jim Crow South who have a contentious relationship with the Italian Kansas City mafia. In the episode, Rabbi and Satchel arrive at a boarding house in Liberal, Kansas, hoping to evade Calamita. The episode is presented in black and white and serves as a homage to The Wizard of Oz.

According to Nielsen Media Research, the episode was seen by an estimated 0.82 million household viewers and gained a 0.1 ratings share among adults aged 18–49. The episode received mostly positive reviews from critics, who praised the cinematography, directing, originality and character development.

Plot
The episode is presented in black and white. Omie Sparkman (Corey Hendrix) has kidnapped a Fadda henchman named Aldo Abruzo (Joel Reitsma), who discloses that Calamita (Gaetano Bruno) is pursuing Satchel (Rodney L. Jones III) and Rabbi (Ben Whishaw) to Liberal, Kansas. He then stops at a gas station, where the owner claims that it is the only gas station in the area, so Calamita will certainly arrive at some point. Omie is allowed to stay in the gas station if he helps painting it, so he releases Aldo from his trunk to help him. During a break, Aldo tries to escape when a car pulls up, forcing Omie to kill him. The car pulls up, revealing that Calamita is driving.

One day before, Rabbi is driving Satchel to safety in Liberal. They stay at a boarding house that divides the sections in "East" and "West", with Rabbi choosing the West section that abides by the New Testament. Rabbi leaves to find money he left over town, only to realize that the spot has been replaced after so many years abandoned, losing the money he left. At his room, Satchel finds a terrier named "Rabbit" for his collar, and decides to adopt it. As Rabbi and Satchel spend their time at the town, they run into a few civilians, including a man who refuses to finish a billboard as he will be jobless after finishing.

Rabbi decides that they must leave Liberal, telling Satchel he cannot take the dog with him. Satchel complains that he wanted something for his birthday. Rabbi decides to buy him a candy bar from a nearby gas station, telling Satchel he will be back just as a storm approaches. He arrives at the gas station, finding the owner and Aldo dead, along with a wounded Omie held at gunpoint by Calamita. As the storm gets more violent, Calamita notices Rabbi and shoots him in the shoulder. Omie hits back at Calamita, who in turn shoots him. Before Calamita kills Rabbi, they notice that a tornado has formed and is nearing them. The tornado destroys the station and sucks Rabbi, Calamita and Omie into the vortex, killing them.

Back in the boarding house, the scene transitions to color. Satchel wakes up and finds that Rabbi has not returned. Feeling taunted by one of the guests, he locks himself in the room until the next day. Realizing that Rabbi has not returned, he decides to leave with Rabbit, armed with one of his revolvers. He leaves by walking through the road, passing the billboard.

Production

Development
In October 2020, it was reported that the ninth episode of the season would be titled "East/West", and was to be written by series creator Noah Hawley, and Lee Edward Colston II, and directed by Michael Uppendahl. This was Hawley's 32nd writing credit, Colston's second writing credit, and Uppendahl's sixth directing credit.

Filming
The episode serves as a homage to The Wizard of Oz, including its presentation in black and white. Before the season started filming, Noah Hawley instructed the crew that the main direction for the season would be "follow the yellow brick road". He further added that The Wizard of Oz "crept into the storytelling, so it felt like this was the place to embrace that metaphor." On the decision to film in black and white, he said "The Wizard of Oz was always built into the season on some level, and that includes cinematically in that hour of going from black-and-white to color. If you're going to do that, you have to start with black-and-white. And obviously, the twister comes in just a few minutes before the end of the episode."

Cinematographer Dana Gonzales commented, "This season was really like the history of American photography. What we did all season was build these palettes from the ground up, together. That's how we create these defined looks, and then we do the shift to color. All of us have to work together perfectly to make the distinct look at this season is — it happened with the color, and the black and white was just another end-of-season challenge."

Reception

Viewers
In its original American broadcast, "East/West" was seen by an estimated 0.82 million household viewers and gained a 0.1 ratings share among adults aged 18–49, according to Nielsen Media Research. This means that 0.1 percent of all households with televisions watched the episode. This was a 17% increase in viewership from the previous episode, which was watched by 0.70 million viewers with a 0.2 in the 18-49 demographics.

Critical reviews
"East/West" received mostly positive reviews from critics. Zack Handlen of The A.V. Club gave the episode a "B" grade and wrote, "I don't think I was ever bored by this, and it feels a bit churlish to criticize something just because it wasn't as good as you wanted it to be. But the flaws of 'East/West' feel endemic of the flaws of the season as a whole. When it finds time to pay attention to its best characters, it works. When it aims bigger, it fumbles. 'East/West' splits the difference, for better and worse."

Alan Sepinwall of Rolling Stone wrote, "'East/West', written by Noah Hawley and Lee Edward Colston II, and directed by Mike Uppendahl, is by far the most Coen-y episode of Fargo Season Four, in large part because it's Hawley and company's own attempt to remake The Wizard of Oz." Nick Schager of Entertainment Weekly wrote, "'Life is nothing but a competition to be the criminal rather than the victim', reads the Bertrand Russell quote that opens 'East/West'. And as Fargos ninth episode suggests, it's a contest in which the participants have very little control."

Keith Phipps of Vulture gave the episode a 4 star rating out of 5 and wrote, "In 'East/West', Omie begins the episode on a journey to make good on that promise, one that takes him to a middle-of-nowhere gas station somewhere between Kansas City and the town of Liberal, Kansas. That's a major development in this season’s storyline, but it also mostly serves as a framing device for the episode, season four's oddest episode and as wild a departure as the series has ever attempted." Nick Harley of Den of Geek gave the episode a 4 star rating out of 5 and wrote, "'East/West' was still a fun detour during a mostly by-the-numbers season. With just two episodes left, will this be the best Season 4 has to offer?" Scott Tobias of The New York Times wrote, "One of the challenges of serialized television shows, especially plot-heavy thrillers like Fargo, is that the demands of moving the various subplots forward can keep individual episodes from having their own distinct flavor. The fourth season has fallen into that mid-season trap a little, sacrificing the thematic purposefulness of the early episodes for a little too much plate-spinning. It needed an audacious, standalone hour like this week's episode to reassert itself again."

References

External links
 

2020 American television episodes
Fargo (TV series) episodes
Television episodes written by Noah Hawley
Television episodes directed by Michael Uppendahl
Black-and-white television episodes